Teviot Creek Dam is a dam in North Queensland, Australia. It is located on Teviot Creek, a tributary of the Isaac River, upstream of the Burton Gorge Dam. Burton Coal Pty Ltd has a licence to take 1,500 ML/year from the dam. The monthly supply reliability based on a relatively short period of record is thought to be 100%. This does not account for the current critical period and the supply should not necessarily be relied on in future. Teviot Creek Dam is owned and operated by RAG Australia Coal subsidiaries.

See also

List of dams and reservoirs in Australia

References

External links
Department of Natural Resources and Mines

Reservoirs in Queensland
North Queensland
Dams in Queensland